Ivanovka is a rural locality (a village) in Partizansky Selsoviet, Meleuzovsky District, Bashkortostan, Russia. The population was 133 as of 2010. There are 4 streets.

Geography 
Ivanovka is located 24 km north of Meleuz (the district's administrative centre) by road. Beregovka is the nearest rural locality.

References 

Rural localities in Meleuzovsky District